Deh Sefid (also Romanized as Deh Sefīd) is a village in Shirvan Rural District, in the Central District of Borujerd County, Lorestan Province, Iran. At the 2006 census, its population was 60, with 10 families.

References 

Towns and villages in Borujerd County